Sé Quién Eres Tú (English: I Know Who You Are) featuring Su Presencia is the second album in Spanish by Australian contemporary worship band Planetshakers. The album was released on 11 November 2016 by Planetshakers Ministries International and Integrity Music. They worked with Joth Hunt in the production of this album.

Background
Planetshakers through their social networks announced their album in Spanish on 11 November 2016. "We are excited to share Sé Quién Eres Tú with our Spanish-speaking brothers and sisters around the world!" said Russell Evans, founder and senior pastor of Planetshakers. "And we have the honor of working with "Su Presencia" to achieve it! Our prayer is that these songs touch hearts for Jesus, encouraging, strengthening, empowering and equipping christians." Unlike his first Spanish album "Nada Es Imposible", the album Sé Quién Eres Tú is performed by the singers of the Colombian Christian band "Su Presencia" and Pastor Danilo Montero, who participated in the single, "#LetsGo". As producer of the album, Joth Hunt had the mission of giving a particular sound to each song. That's why he put in "Come Right Now" an "iconic" sound, as he calls it, to catch people from the beginning. This was achieved with a riser, a sound effect made with a synthesizer, which lets you know what song it is as soon as it sounds. One day BJ Pridham, a Planetshakers vocalist, showed Joth Hunt, also the lead vocalist and guitarist of the band, a track that was playing on the radio. Both were struck by funky bass riffs (a musical phrase that is often repeated) and some dance elements. "It would be great to write a song of praise like this," they said. "We use the sound and go directly to the verse, which focuses on the slap bass" (technique in which the bass strings are struck against the fretboard), explains Joth Hunt, who highlights the work of Josh Ham, bassist of the band, in this single. Henry González, vocalist of the ministry of praise "Su Presencia", interprets Ven Aquí, the version of "Come Right Now" in Spanish, which was translated by the members of the Bogota group.

Promotion
The first track of the album, "Ven Aquí" (featuring Su Presencia), was released on November 4, 2016 as the first single, when the pre-order of the album began.

Awards and accolades
In the 2017 the album Sé Quién Eres Tú (featuring Su Presencia) was nominated for a Dove Award in the category "Spanish Language Album of the Year" at the 48th Annual GMA Dove Awards.

Planetshakers (featuring Su Presencia) have been nominated by the Arpa Awards (México, 2016) in the category: "Best song in participation" "Sé quién eres tú" (2016).

Track listing

NOTE:  These songs are Spanish-language translations of Planetshakers songs in English.  The original English-language song is listed next to each title.

Personnel 

Adapted from AllMusic.

 Planetshakers – primary artist
 Juan David Muñoz – vocals, vocal producer
 Tuti Vega – vocals
 Danilo Montero – vocals
 Christy Corson – vocals
 Henry Gonzalez – vocals
 Diana Julio – vocals 
 Germán Mariño – vocals
 Daniela Reyes – vocals
 Germán Malagón – vocals
 Juliana Serra – vocals
 Cindy Villabón – vocals
 Nora Zamora – vocals
 Joth Hunt – songwriter, percussion, producer
 Samantha Evans – songwriter
 Brian "BJ" Pridham – songwriter
 Andy Harrison – songwriter
 Israel Houghton – songwriter
 Mitch Wong – songwriter
 Steph Ling – songwriter
 Josh Ham – songwriter
 Joshua Brown – A&R, artist, vocal producer
 Adrian Thompson – A&R
 Andrés Corson – liner notes
 Samuel Rodriguez – liner notes
 Matthew Gray – Mastering
 Timothy Chew – design, illustrations
 Su Presencia – translation
 Russell Evans – executive producer
 C. Ryan Dunham – executive producer, liner notes

References

2016 albums
Spanish-language albums
Planetshakers albums
Christian music albums by Australian artists